The Jolly Beggar, also known as The Gaberlunzieman, is Child ballad 279. The song's chorus inspired lines in Lord Byron's poem "So, we'll go no more a roving".

Synopsis
A beggar comes over the hills one day, and knocks on the door of a local farmer and asks for a roof for the night. Curiously, he will not accept a bed in the barn, but wishes only to sleep by the kitchen fire. Late at night, the farmer's daughter comes down to lock the kitchen door. The beggar and daughter exchange words, and fall in love. They sleep together, and through some unmentioned premise, the daughter accuses the man of being a nobleman come dressed as a beggar to woo her. He convinces her that he is indeed only a beggar, and she kicks him out. However, it turns out he was, in fact, a noble.

Versions
 Planxty have recorded a version of this song on their eponymous 1973 album as "The Jolly Beggar". According to the group, the Jolly Beggar in question was King James V of Scotland.
 The Corries recorded a version of this song (a condensed version of Child's second version) on their album Bonnet, Belt and Sword. However, somewhat confusingly, they recorded it under the title "Gaberlunzie King", and this album includes a completely different song recorded under the title "The Jolly Beggar".

See also
 List of the Child Ballads
 The Beggar-Laddie

References

External links
The Jolly Beggar
The Gaberlunzie Man, a variant

Child Ballads
Year of song unknown